Whopper is a hamburger sold by Burger King.

Whopper may also refer to:

 Whoppers, a brand of malted milk balls sold by Hershey

Burger King products and brands
 BK Whopper Bar, a higher-end fast-food chain created by Burger King in 2009
 WhopperCoin, a former cryptocurrency launched by the Russian branch of Burger King as a loyalty program in 2017

Menu items
 Chicken Whopper, a chicken sandwich introduced in 2002
 Whopperito, a burger-themed burrito introduced in 2016

Advertisements
 Whopper Whopper, a Burger King advertisement that grew to fame in 2023

People
 Gordon Lane (1921–1973), Australian rules footballer, nickname "Whopper"
 Mike Lenarduzzi (born 1972), Canadian retired ice hockey goaltender, nickname "Whopper"
 Billy Paultz (born 1948), American retired ABA and NBA basketball player, nickname "The Whopper"

Television
 Willie Whopper, an animated cartoon character created by Ub Iwerks
 "The Whopper", an episode of the television series Lassie

See also
 War Operation Plan Response (WOPR), a supercomputer in the movie WarGames

Lists of people by nickname